All sides of the Tigray War have been repeatedly accused of committing war crimes since it began in November 2020. A September 2022 report by the UN found evidence of widespread "war crimes and crimes against humanity" committed by all parties, in particular, the Ethiopian federal government, the State of Eritrea and the Tigray People's Liberation Front (TPLF)."

Former Tigray rebel Mulugeta Gebrehiwot, founder of the Institute for Peace and Security Studies, described the killings of Tigrayans by the Ethiopian National Defense Force (ENDF) and Eritrean Defence Forces (EDF) as "literally genocide by decree," and sources say the forces have engaged in torture, ethnic cleansing and widespread sexual violence. The Tigray Defense Forces (TDF) have also been accused of extrajudicial killings of civilians, war rape, using civilians as human shields, and widespread looting and destruction of civilian infrastructure in Afar and Amhara Regions.

Deliberate starvation and removal of basic services 

In early April 2021, the World Peace Foundation argued that Article 8(2)(b)(xxv) of the Rome Statute of the International Criminal Court was likely to be relevant to the case of starvation in the Tigray War. The authors concluded that the Ethiopian and Eritrean governments were responsible for starvation, listing evidence in Section 4 of their report. The authors argued that "circumstantial evidence suggest[ed] that [the starvation was] intentional, systematic and widespread."

Ethiopian government forces 
Mark Lowcock, who formerly led OCHA, stated in October 2021 that the Ethiopian federal government was deliberately starving Tigray, "running a sophisticated campaign to stop aid getting in" and that there was "not just an attempt to starve six million people but an attempt to cover up what's going on." Ethiopian troops have reportedly withheld food from going to Tigrayan civilians who were suspected of having links to Tigrayan fighters. A student based in Europe, and in contact with her family in Tigray Region, said that in the Irob woreda where her family lives, "If you don't bring your father, your brothers, you don't get the aid, you'll starve."

According to a September 2022 UN commission, the Ethiopian government, along with forces allied with them, engaged in deliberate efforts to deny the Tigray Region "access to basic services […] and humanitarian assistance," leaving 90% of Tigrayan residents in dire conditions. The commission also stated that they had "reasonable grounds to believe" that the Ethiopian government was using deliberate starvation as a war tactic. It called on both the federal government and the TPLF to let these services resume without hindrance.

Eritrean forces 
De Waal argued that the looting by the EDF of cars, generators, food stores, cattle, sheep and goats in Tigray Region was a violation of international criminal law that "prohibits a belligerent from removing, destroying or rendering useless objects indispensable to the survival of the civilian population" (Rome Statute, Article 7, 2.(b)).  A witness to the Axum massacre stated that the EDF "burned crops […] forced farmers and priests to slaughter their own animals […] stole medicine from health facilities and destroyed the infrastructure." Reports of Eritrean looting continued into late 2022, with allegations that the EDF was seizing food and other materials from Tigrayan homes, in violation of the November 2022 peace agreement.

Tigrayan forces 
An EHRC report stated that:

The report also concluded that widespread looting and destruction caused by the TDF occupation were the main drivers of displacement from Afar and Amhara regions. Satellite imagery analysis confirmed that the TDF intentionally burned a rural village to the ground near the town of Agamsa in the Kobo district of the Amhara Region.

Crimes against humanity 

The EHRC claimed in November 2020 that the Mai Kadra massacre may constitute a crime against humanity. Human Rights Concern Eritrea claimed in February 2021 that crimes against humanity occurred during the war, in particular in the "appalling treatment of Eritrean refugees in the Shimelba and Hitsats camps" and called for an immediate independent international enquiry.

Many sources have accused the Ethiopian and Eritrean governments of engaging in crimes against humanity via ethnic cleansing of Tigrayans. In its 26 February 2021 report on the Axum massacre, Amnesty International described the indiscriminate shelling of Axum by the ENDF and EDF in January 2021 as possibly "amount[ing] to war crimes", and the following mass executions of Axum civilians by Eritrean troops as a crime against humanity.

Wartime sexual violence 

War rape and sexual violence have been widespread throughout the war, and has been perpetrated by virtually all sides. According to one witness in May 2021, girls as young as 8 and women as old as 72 were among those affected by sexual violence. Such sexual violence is often accompanied with other type of physical and mental abuse. With physical abuses included burning their victims with hot iron or cigarettes, forcing metal rods or nails into their victim's genitals, etc. Mental abuses including raping their victim in front of their family members, forcing their victims to rape their family members, calling their victims by derogatory words and ethnic slurs, etc. After being subjected to sexual violence, many women become infected with STIs like HIV, and its often hard for them to find treatments due to the collapse of medical infrastructure during war and senses of shame.

A UN investigation in September 2022 confirmed the reports of widespread rape and sexual violence by all parties, including the practice of mass rape as "retribution" by the TDF, as well as the use of sexual slavery by Ethiopian and Eritrean forces.

ENDF, EDF and Amhara forces 
Often, soldiers and militias subjected Tigrayan women and girls, including pregnant women and young girls, to rape, gang rape, sexual slavery, sexual mutilation, and other forms of sexual torture. According to nine doctors in Ethiopia and one in a Sudanese refugee camp interviewed by CNN, sexual violence in the Tigray War constituted rape as a weapon of war. The women treated by the doctors stated that the ENDF, EDF and Amhara soldiers who raped them described Tigrayans as having no history and culture, that the intent was to "ethnically cleans[e] Tigray", to "Amharise" them or remove their Tigrayan identity and "blood line." One of the doctors, Tedros Tefera, stated, "Practically this has been a genocide." In March 2021, The Daily Telegraph argued that testimonies supported the rape as a weapon of war interpretation, stating that "Survivors, doctors, aid workers and experts speaking to the Telegraph all pointed to rape being systematically used as a weapon of war by Ethiopian and Eritrean forces." Reasons for the rape that were stated to the victims included the aim of "cleansing Tigrayan blood." These reports of targeted, mass sexual violence against Tigrayans was corroborated by an April 2022 joint Human Rights Watch–Amnesty International report on the Western Zone, describing similar occurrences.

Tigrayan rebel forces 
In January 2022, Amnesty International published a report stating that acts of rape and violence by the TPLF in the Amhara Region "may have been committed as part of a systematic attack against the Amhara civilian population." Survivors spoke of being gang raped, beaten and called ethnic slurs, often in front of their children. Reportedly, some TPLF fighters used the rape of Tigrayan women by pro-government forces as a justification for committing sexual violence themselves. In March 2022, the EHRC published a report stating that the TDF committed widespread and systematic acts of sexual violence against women and girls in the Afar and Amhara regions, including through gang rape and rape with foreign objects.

Ethnic cleansing of Tigrayans in the Western Zone

Early reports 
According to a report by The New York Times released in February 2021, confidential U.S. government documents described Amhara Region officials and armed forces as carrying out ethnic cleansing in the Western Zone, "deliberately and efficiently rendering Western Tigray ethnically homogeneous through the organized use of force and intimidation […] Whole villages were severely damaged or completely erased."  Many Tigrayans fled across the border to Sudan, and those unable to flee were captured, and forcibly transferred to other parts of Tigray. In March, the United Nations Office for the Coordination of Humanitarian Affairs (OCHA) stated that "tens of thousands of people [had] been displaced from [the Western Zone] allegedly on ethnic grounds." The OCHA also confirmed that the zone was run by Amhara regional authorities, with humanitarian access "only [being] possible through Amhara Region." The Norwegian Refugee Council estimated that between 140,000 and 185,000 people had fled from the Western Zone to Shire, in the span of around 2 weeks in March 2021.

In contrast to towns with majority Tigrayan populations, the Times said that towns with majority Amhara populations were "thriving, with bustling shops, bars and restaurants."

HRW–Amnesty report and Foreign Affairs 
In an extensive, 240-page report by Human Rights Watch and Amnesty International, released on 6 April 2022, it was documented that Amhara forces engaged in systemic campaigns deliberately targeting Tigrayans in the Western Zone. Tigrayans were often killed en masse, forcibly expelled, or otherwise experienced a number of crimes against humanity, including torture, rape, sex slavery, forced disappearances and arbitrary detention. The report also stated that Amhara forces participated in mass killings of Tigrayans; in some cases, the Mai Kadra massacre was used as a justification to commit mass killings in "revenge," while in other cases, there was "little apparent motive beyond spreading terror." According to one witness, recounting what she discovered upon returning to her hometown in December 2020:

Tigrayans were reportedly told, in no uncertain terms, to leave the Western Zone or be killed. 42 Tigrayans who were interviewed by Reuters, for instance, gave broadly similar accounts of receiving papers explicitly mentioning this, with some of them also saying that they witnessed Tigrayans being rounded up by "Amhara gunmen." According to a June 2022 article by Foreign Affairs:

After the signing of the Pretoria agreement 

Charges of forced removals of Tigrayans continued into late 2022, even as peace agreements were being signed and implemented by the federal government and the TPLF. On 10 November, according to an aid group (which chose to remain anonymous), over 2,800 people (including children) were held in detention centres for at least a year, before Fano, an Amhara militia group, rounded them up into trucks and moved them to a town near Sheraro in the North Western Zone, which lies outside of Amhara's territorial claims.

Denial and obfuscation 
Both Amhara and federal Ethiopian authorities had repeatedly denied that ethnic cleansing or targeted ethnic violence was taking playing in the area. Prime Minister Abiy dismissed reports of crimes committed by Amhara forces, saying in an April 2021 speech to Ethiopian parliament that "portraying [the Amhara regional forces] as a looter and conqueror is very wrong." The Ministry of Foreign Affairs said Ethiopia "vehemently opposes such accusations," describing them as "completely unfounded," "spurious" and "[blown] out of proportion."

Yabsira Eshetie, the administrator of the occupied Western Zone, claimed that "no one was kicking them out, no one was destroying their houses even. […] It is lawful here," and said that "only criminals had been detained." Gizachew Muluneh, head of Amhara Regional Communication Affairs, denied the reports of ethnic cleansing in the Western Zone, calling it "propaganda," and claiming that the number of displaced Tigrayans was exaggerated. Gizachew also claimed, in response to U.S. criticism, that "these areas are not Tigrayan areas, [historically]. […] Our forces are not in the Tigrayan areas, rather our forces are in Amhara region," alluding to an Amhara nationalist claim that what is now the Western Zone, an area formerly part of Amhara, was illegally occupied by Tigray, and must therefore be taken back under Amhara control.

Allegations of evidence destruction 
The BBC reported on 7 May 2022 that, according to the testimonies of 15 eyewitnesses, Amhara security forces and Fano militias – throughout the occupied Western Zone – began systemically digging up mass graves of ethnic Tigrayans, burning their bodies, and moving them to another, separate location. Witnesses stated that this started to occur a few days after funding for a UN war crimes investigation into the Tigray War was approved in March 2022 (which Ethiopia voted against). This practice is alleged to have occurred Humera, Adebay and Beaker.

Genocide claims 
The Ethiopian and Eritrean governments have been repeatedly accused of committing a genocide in Tigray.

Hate speech 
On 15 June 2021, the EU's special envoy to Ethiopia, Pekka Haavisto, said that senior members of the Ethiopian government called for "wip[ing] out all Tigrayans for 100 years." The Ethiopian Government denied these allegations. In mid-September 2021, Daniel Kibret – an advisor to Prime Minister Abiy – made a speech in which he compared Tigrayan forces to Satan, and described them as "weeds" that "should be erased and disappeared from historical records." In October 2022, numerous agencies, human rights organizations and scholars began issuing warnings of dramatically escalating levels of violence and hate speech against Tigrayans, with some warning of the emergence of a possible genocide. UN adviser for genocide prevention Alice Wairimu Nderitu expressed her unease at the "horrifying levels of hate speech and incitement to violence" in the country. She gave examples of social media posts describing Tigrayans as a "cancer" or "virus," with one post expressing a desire for killing "every single youth from Tigray."

Claims of intent 
In December 2020, Alex de Waal argued that Eritrean president Isaias Afwerki had "the intention of annihilating the Tigray People's Liberation Front (TPLF) and reducing Tigray to a condition of complete incapacity." De Waal argued for intent on the part of Isaias by referring to "eleven high-ranking colleagues [of Isaias], heroes of the [Eritrean War of Independence] […] and ten journalists" who were arrested in 2001 and remained missing.

Also in December 2020, Rashid Abdi, interviewed by Vice, stated that there had been two years' of planning by Ethiopian Prime Minister Abiy Ahmed and Isaias, who had "fears and suspicions about the TPLF", and stated that Abiy had "criminalised the entire TPLF, tagged them with treason." Vice interviewed a refugee, Amanael Kahsay, who attributed part of the Mai Kadra massacre to the Fano militia, and stated "We know he is planning to exterminate us, all Tigrayans in general."  According to investigations by the Office of the United Nations High Commissioner for Human Rights (OHCHR), Amnesty International, the Ethiopian Human Rights Commission (EHRC), and the Ethiopian Human Rights Council (EHRCO), most of the victims of the Mai Kadra massacre were Amhara.

On 28 January 2021, Robert I. Rotberg, a professor in governance and foreign affairs, classified the war crimes of the Tigray war using the informal term "purposeful ethnic cleansing", which he saw as "a precursor to all-out genocide." He called for the responsibility to protect procedures to be implemented. Rotberg attributed intent to Abiy, claiming that he "had seemingly decided that [the] very existence [of Tigrayans] threatened his control of 110 million Ethiopians." On 19 October 2022, World Health Organization Director-General Tedros Adhanom Ghebreyesus, who is Tigrayan himself, said that there was a "very narrow window now to prevent genocide," in response to the major wave of violence that occurred after the collapse of the March–August ceasefire that same year.

Researchers

In November 2020, Genocide Watch upgraded its alert status for Ethiopia as a whole to the ninth stage of genocide, extermination, referring to the Gawa Qanqa massacre, casualties of the Tigray War, 2020 Ethiopia bus attack and the Metekel massacre and listing affected groups as the Amhara, Tigrayans, Oromo, Gedeo, Gumuz, Agaw and Qemant. On 20 November 2021, Genocide Watch again issued a Genocide Emergency Alert for Ethiopia, stating that "both sides are committing genocide", and that "Prime Minister Abiy Ahmed's hate speech and calls for war" together with attacks by the ENDF and TPLF put Ethiopia into stages 4 (dehumanization), 6 (polarization), 8 (persecution), and 9 (extermination) of the ten stages of genocide.

Peace researcher and founder of the Institute for Peace and Security Studies, Mulugeta Gebrehiwot, stated on 27 January 2021 that the killings of Tigrayans by the Ethiopian National Defense Force (ENDF) and Eritrean Defence Forces (EDF) were "literally genocide by decree. Wherever they're moving, whomever they find, they kill him or her, [whether it's] an old man, a child, a nursing women, or anything."

Kjetil Tronvoll, a peace and conflict studies researcher and professor at the Oslo New University College, stated in a Twitter thread on 27 February 2021 that, for the first time in his three decades of studying Horn of Africa conflicts, he considered the possibility that the term genocide might apply to the actions of the EDF in the Tigray War. He listed separate components as widespread and systematic: massacres of civilians based on their identity as Tigrayans; sexual violence as an aspect of a genocidal campaign; deliberate looting of infrastructure and looting and destruction of food resources for inducing starvation; and destruction and looting of cultural heritage to attack cultural identity. Tronvoll suggested that seen together, the pattern of all these separate war crimes and "likely" crimes against humanity could establish genocidal intent by the EDF against Tigrayans in Tigray Region. He stated that the federal Ethiopian authorities could hold part of the responsibility by having "invited and accommodated" the EDF to participate in the Tigray War.

On the other hand, EHRC Director Daniel Bekele said the EHRC-OHCHR Joint Investigation (Office of the United Nations High Commissioner for Human Rights) did not identify violations amounting to genocide.

Politicians
The elected and deposed leader of Tigray Region, Debretsion Gebremichael, stated on 30 January 2021 that the war was a "genocidal war [that was being] waged upon the People of Tigray to illegally appropriate by force [their] identity and [their] basic right to existence." Debretsion stated that the Tigrayans were being attacked "to exterminate them with bullets and weaponized hunger."

Massacres and killings of civilians

A witness, who spent two months walking between villages in central Tigray, wrote in early February 2021 in Ethiopia Insight that the towns of the area had become ghost towns and that "once the center of trade, exchange and hope, [the towns had become] the scene of war crimes that [would] never be fully articulated or persecuted."

By ENDF and EDF-allied forces 
Extrajudicial executions of civilians by the ENDF and EDF were reported in and around Adigrat, Hagere Selam, Hitsats, Humera, Irob, Axum, Chefa Robit, and Amuru, among others.

Axum 

Witnesses and survivors, including refugees in Sudan, reported that the Eritrean Defence Forces carried out a massacre in Axum that killed between 100–800 civilians in late November 2020. These reports have been corroborated by a number of news agencies and human rights organizations. The Eritrean government denied these allegations, and expressed anger at Amnesty International's report on the massacre, claiming it was "transparently unprofessional" and "politically motivated," accusing Amnesty of fabricating evidence.

A witness to the first part of the Axum massacre stated that the EDF soldiers had been ordered to kill all Tigrayan males older than four years old. Alem Berhe, who was in Mekelle on 3 November, on the evening of which the Northern Command attacks occurred, escaped to Addis Ababa after two months. Alem stated that the EDF's orders were "to exterminate you [Tigrayans] – all of you" above the age of seven years. Another witness described the limit as either "any male over the age of 14" or "those who 'pee against the wall.'"

Debre Abbay 
In February 2021, footage surfaced on the internet showing what appeared to be the aftermath of a massacre, roughly geolocated near the Debre Abbay monastery. The videos featured multiple people wearing Ethiopian army uniforms speaking Amharic, with one noted as saying "you should have finished off the survivors." The video's authenticity was verified by multiple news outlets as genuine,with total estimates of dead civilians ranging from between 30 and 40. The Daily Telegraph described the full video as "too graphic to publish."

By the TDF and allied forces

Chenna and Kobo 

In early September 2021, the Tigray Defense Forces were accused of extrajudicially killing 120–200 villagers in Chenna Teklehaymanot and 600 residents of Kobo district in the Amhara Region. In both incidents, residents said that Tigrayan forces had killed villagers who had resisted looting. On 9 December 2021, Human Rights Watch published a report in which residents described witnessing Tigrayan forces summarily execute dozens of civilians in the village of Chenna and the town of Kobo between 31 August and 9 September 2021.

Disputed perpetrators

Mai Kadra

Bombing of civilian targets 

Human Rights Watch stated that, during the early days of the war, Ethiopian forces launched artillery attacks which struck hospitals, schools, and markets in Mekelle, Humera and Shire, killing at least 83 civilians, including children, and wounding over 300. In each of these attacks, the Tigrayan special forces had already retreated. In places that had armed forces present such as Humera, the presence of local militias was too insignificant to defend the town. In Humera, local residents said artillery fire also came from Eritrea on 9 November 2020.

In August 2021, the TDF indiscriminately shelled and killed 107 civilians, including 27 children, and injured 35 civilians during an offensive in Galikoma, Afar Region.

In an airstrike on 22 June 2021, the Ethiopian Air Force killed 64 civilians in Togogwa (Southwestern Tigray) and injured 180 others. In January 2022, the Ethiopian Ari Force also launched an airstrike into an IDP camp located in Dedebit, killing at least 56. Both Human Rights Watch and UN investigators have characterized this as a war crime.

Allegations of white phosphorous use on civilians 
On 24 May 2021, a report by The Telegraph featured pictures of severe burn victims, and detailed accounts from them and their families, who described incendiary weapons being launched into multiple civilian areas in Central and Eastern Tigray throughout the month of April. Chemical weapons experts, including former Joint CBRN Regiment commander Hamish de Bretton-Gordon and Dan Kaszeta of the Royal United Services Institute, considered their injuries to bare a strong resemblance with those caused by white phosphorus munitions. Witnesses attributed responsibility for the attacks to Ethiopian and Eritrean forces, and said that fighting was not happing in these areas when the attacks occurred.

Ethiopia rejected the claims of the Telegraph report, with the Ministry of Foreign Affairs saying that the country "has not employed and will never use such banned munitions," further stating that it takes the Chemical Weapons Convention "extremely seriously."

Treatment of prisoners

Northern Command attacks (November 2020)
According to Abiy Ahmed, ENDF prisoners of war were executed by the TPLF during the Northern Command attacks. Abiy stated that the "TPLF identified and separated hundreds of unarmed Ethiopian soldiers of non-Tigrayan origin, tied their hands and feet together, massacred them in cold blood, and left their bodies lying in open air." He suggested that the TPLF forces had "record[ed] themselves singing and dancing on the bodies of their victims." The Tigray Regional Government has denied this.

Other war crimes

Use of civilians as human shields 
In Chenna, Amhara Region, the TDF entered residential areas without allowing civilians to leave, then started shooting at ENDF positions, effectively utilizing the local population as human shields.

Refoulement 

De Waal argued that the refoulement of Eritrean refugees back to Eritrea was a violation of international law.

Legal aspects

Legal bodies
Kassahun Molla Yilma, former head of Jimma University School of Law and prosecutor, argued in February 2021 that for the Mai Kadra massacre of the Tigray War and other atrocities taking place in Ethiopia, it would be in Ethiopia's interests to become party to the International Criminal Court (ICC). Among other reasons, Kassahun said that joining the ICC would "help catalyze reform regarding the legal framework regulating atrocity crimes in Ethiopia", since the provisions in the Ethiopian Criminal Code at the time "[did] not fit the nature of atrocity crimes committed [in] Ethiopia", and that the ICC would the Ethiopian justice system build capacity for investigations and prosecutions for the crimes. Kassahun said that as the ICC is a court of last resort, and since Ethiopia was not, as of February 2021, a party to the ICC, war crimes committed during the Tigray War would not be tried in the ICC.

Debretsion called for Isaias and Abiy to be tried in an international court.

Arrests

Enkuayehu Mesele, head of TPLF militias in Western Zone, was arrested in Shire in mid-December 2020. Amanuel Belete, a commander in the Northern Command, accused Enkuayehu of "countless murders and intimidation" in Baeker, Qafta and Humera, of ethnic profiling of the ENDF.

International investigations and prosecutions

ACHPR

The African Commission on Human and Peoples' Rights stated that it would start a Commission of Inquiry on Tigray on 17 June 2021 under Article 45 of the African Charter on Human and Peoples' Rights. The commission was planned to initially start for three months, with headquarters in Banjul, and to "conduct investigations on the ground and in neighbouring countries when the conditions are met." The chair of the Commission of Inquiry, Rémy Ngoy Lumbu, stated that the commission's report would be published by the end of 2021.

EHRC–OHCHR Tigray investigation

In mid-2021, the EHRC and the OHCHR launched a joint investigation into human rights violations of the Tigray War committed by all parties. The EHRC–OHCHR joint investigation team's report was published on 3 November 2021.

References

External links

International Commission of Human Rights Experts on Ethiopia – United Nations
Joint Report of the EHRC-OHCHR Joint Investigations on Human Rights in Tigray
“We will erase you from this land”: Crimes against humanity and ethnic cleansing in Ethiopia’s Western Tigray Zone – Joint Amnesty International / Human Rights Watch investigation

Tigray war
Tigray War